Tracheliastes is a genus of parasitic copepods, containing the following species:
Tracheliastes brevicorpus Kuang, 1980
Tracheliastes chondrostomi Hanek, 1969
Tracheliastes longicollis Markevich, 1940
Tracheliastes maculatus Kollar, 1835
Tracheliastes mourkii Hoffman, 1881
Tracheliastes polycolpus Nordmann, 1832
Tracheliastes sachalinensis Markevich, 1936
Tracheliastes tibetanus Kuang, 1964

References

Siphonostomatoida